953 Painleva is a minor planet orbiting the Sun. It was discovered on 29 April 1921 by the Russian astronomer Benjamin Jekhowsky. The planet was named in honor of the French statesman and mathematician Paul Painlevé.

References

External links 
 
 

000953
Named minor planets
19210429
Discoveries by Benjamin Jekhowsky